JINYA Ramen Bar is a chain of restaurants based in Los Angeles, California, specializing in ramen noodle dishes. Los Angeles food critic Jonathan Gold has praised the restaurant.

History
Founded by Tomo Takahashi in 2000 in Tokyo, Takahashi opened for US in 2010. Restaurant has 37 branches across Canada and America.

See also
 Ramen shop

References

External links
JINYA Ramen Bar website

Japanese restaurants in the United States
Restaurant chains in the United States
Ramen shops